Elmoadab Tabriz Football Club (Bashgah-e Futbal-e Elmuadab Tebriz) is an Iranian football club based in Tabriz, Iran who compete in Azadegan League.

The club bought the licence of Shahrdari Tabriz in Azadegan League in 2019.

See also
 Azadegan League

References

Football clubs in Iran
Association football clubs established in 2013
2013 establishments in Iran
Sport in Tabriz